Ericka Dunlap (born December 29, 1981) is an American beauty pageant titleholder from Orlando, Florida who was named Miss Florida 2003 and subsequently crowned Miss America 2004. Dunlap was the first African American woman to be crowned Miss Florida in the Miss America pageant's 81-year history. As of 2022, she is the only African American woman to have been crowned Miss Florida.

Personal
Dunlap is a native of Orlando, attended William R. Boone High School, and is a graduate of the University of Central Florida. While attending college at the University of Central Florida, she became a member of Delta Sigma Theta sorority.

She and her then-husband, Brian Kleinschmidt, appeared on The Amazing Race 15, where they placed third overall.

Dunlap gave birth to a daughter in 2020.

Career
In 2004, she was crowned Miss America, becoming the seventh African American woman to hold the title. 
Dunlap's platform was "United We Stand, Divided We Fall Behind: Celebrating Diversity and Inclusion." Dunlap appeared on The Oprah Winfrey Show, Hollywood Squares, Live With Regis and Kelly, and Fox News’ The O'Reilly Factor. She also served as Grand Marshal of the Talladega 500 NASCAR race. She has also appeared in a number of movies, including District 9.

Ms. Dunlap's international appeal began with her travels to the Middle-East during her reign as Miss America to entertain and serve the American troops for Thanksgiving. Most recently, Ericka traveled to Afghanistan to once again boost morale.

Currently, Ericka is a Public Relations Specialist and has formed Crown Jewel Consulting. Her charitable organization, The Crown Jewel Foundation, promotes social development skills and image awareness in young girls, and is set to re-launch in the summer of 2011 with the Princess Power Project. She continues to travel as a special guest speaker as well as developing her entrepreneurial interests in her hometown of Orlando, Florida.

Since the fall of 2013, Ericka has been seen as a judge at The American Idol Experience at Disney's Hollywood Studios at Walt Disney World.

She ran for the Orlando City Commission, District 5 in 2017, but lost to incumbent Regina Hill.

References

External links

1981 births
Living people
Miss America 2004 delegates
Miss America winners
People from Orlando, Florida
The Amazing Race (American TV series) contestants
William R. Boone High School alumni
University of Central Florida alumni
Delta Sigma Theta members
Beauty queen-politicians